The notable 1974–75 Norwegian 1. Divisjon season was the 36th season of ice hockey in Norway. Ten teams had participated in the league, and Frisk Asker won the championship.

First round

Second round

Final round

Relegation round

External links 
 Norwegian Ice Hockey Federation

Nor
GET-ligaen seasons
1974 in Norwegian sport
1975 in Norwegian sport